Isoetes sinensis, the narrow quillwort, is a species of plant in the family Isoetaceae.

Information
Isoetes sinensis is native to China and Korea. Its natural habitat is swamps. It is threatened by habitat loss. In China, this species is native to the areas of Anhui, Jiangsu, and Zhejiang.

Conservation
Isoetes sinensis is recorded to be a critically endangered species due to industrial development and agricultural expansion. This species occupies freshwater environments and within terrestrial systems. In order to help conserve this species, amplified fragment length polymorphisms (AFLPs) were used to research the genetic variation of it and the population structure of seven extant populations of the species. This investigation helped provide useful data for creating conservation strategies to help preserve the species.

References

Critically endangered flora of Asia
Flora of Anhui
Flora of China
Flora of Jiangsu
Flora of Korea
Flora of Zhejiang
sinensis
Taxonomy articles created by Polbot